Kingsrow may refer to:
The row farthest from the player in draughts (checkers).
KingsRow is a checkers engine.
Kings Row a 1942 film which tells the story of a group of children who grow up leading supposedly idyllic lives in a small town with disturbing secrets.
King's Row (TV series), an hour-long American television period drama
King's row, a London road known for shopping and running through Pimlico, Bethnal green, Walworth and Knightsbridge